Anne Margrethe Qvitzow (1652 - c. 1700)  was a Danish poet and memoir writer. She is most associated with her translations.

Biography
Qvitzow was born and raised at the family estate Sandagergård on the island of Funen, Denmark. She was the daughter of noble officer Erik Qvitzow (1616–78) and Susanne Juel (d. 1685). She was given an unusually high education: at this time, female members of the Danish nobility were normally barely taught to read and write. However, as showed herself to be very gifted early on, her parents hired private teachers to educate her in Danish, German, Latin, Greek, French, grammar, logic, rhetoric, geometry, astronomy, arithmetic, musical science, and also begun studies in Hebrew. In 1669, she translated  Lasternis skrabe from German into Danish and Latin. She translated De Officiis by Cicero and Commentarii de Bello Gallico by Julius Caesar) from Latin into Danish in circa 1670.

During the 1670s and 1680s, she was a celebrity.  In 1673, Qvitzow rejected the idea that her learning should be considered in any way remarkable because of her sex, and stated that if women were given the same education as men, they would prove themselves to be just as capable. Bishop Erik Pontoppidan (1698–1764) later called her “Heroina longe eruditissima” and compared her to Dutch artist and poet Anna Maria van Schurman (1607–1678).

In 1676, Qvitzow married noble Christian von Pappenheim (d. 1705). Reportedly, her spouse wasted their fortune. In 1685, she wrote elegy to Ove Rosenkrantz Axelsen til Raakilde, a poem dedicated the memory of Ove Rosenkrantz Axelsen. Her writing is no longer heard of after that date. Her late life is not much known and her exact dated of death is unknown.

Qvitzow was included in contemporary dictionaries and work of female scholars and learned women, (gynæcée) by 
Matthias Henriksen Schacht (1660-1700), Albert Lauritsen Thura (1700–1740) and Fr. Chr. Schønau.

See also
 Anne Margrethe Bredal 
 Birgitte Thott

References

Sources
 Elisabeth Møller Jensen (red.): Nordisk kvindelitteraturhistorie, 1993-98. 
 Hans Jørgen Birch: Billedgalleri for Fruentimmer, 1793. 
 Fr. Chr. Schønau: Samling af danske lærde Fruentimer, 1753.
 Dansk Biografisk Leksikon.

External links
The Honey-Sweet Delicacies of the Muses (The History of Nordic Women’s Literature.  Marianne Alenius . 2011)

1652 births
1700 deaths
Danish nobility
Danish feminists
17th-century Danish women writers
Danish women poets
Danish women memoirists
17th-century Danish memoirists
17th-century Danish poets